Fabian Bohn (born 2 March 1982), better known by his stage name Brennan Heart, is a Dutch DJ and a hardstyle producer.

Career

Blademasterz
In 2002, Fabian Bohn co-founded with Pieter Heijnen (known as DJ Thera) a duo named Blademasterz concentrating on making hardstyle music, after having experimented with various styles of music like techno, hard trance and tech trance. After more than three years of cooperation, the duo split and went their own ways, with Bohn taking the name Brennan Heart and Pieter Heijnen continuing as DJ Thera.

Solo
Bohn, now Brennan Heart, continued producing hardstyle music after the split. In 2006, Brennan Heart joined the Dutch label Scantraxx Records (created by The Prophet). Under that banner, Brennan Heart created his own sublabel M!D!FY in May 2006.

In 2009, he released his first album as a solo artist, Musical Impressions. In 2014, he released the second album, Evolution of Style, which featured Imaginary, featuring Jonathan Mendelsohn and Lose My Mind, featuring his good friend Wildstylez, that has become smash-hit overnight. In 2016, two years after the last album release, he dropped his third album where's I AM HARDSTYLE was born. The year after, he released his fourth album, On Demand.

In 2019, ten years after his first album he released his fifth album Show Your True Colors. A little more than one year later during the global pandemic he decided to release his sixth album Brennan Heart & Friends where he worked with artists like Kayzo, Armin van Buuren, and many more.

The year 2021 was a year to celebrate 20 years in the business with his seventh album Brennan Heart 20 Yrs containing 4 CDs of his best music over the past 2 decades.

WE R Music and I AM HARDSTYLE

In 2012, he left Scantraxx Records and established his own music label Brennan Heart Music. He rebranded his own label as WE R Music later adding two other extra full labels WE R Raw and WE R Tomorrow. Code Black, Toneshifterz and Outbreak decided to join forces in 2013 by joining WE R Music.

He later founded I Am Hardstyle as not just a record label, but also a brand. Currently, this label has include the member from previously founded WE R Music, along with the recently launched I Am Hardstyle Amplify, where he will recruits next-gen Hardstyle Artists.

Radio show
A monthly radio show at the Dutch radio station SLAM!FM was broadcast every Thursday under the general title WE R Hardstyle. The second Thursday of every month is presented by Fabian Bohn. MC Villain broadcasts the first Thursdays of the month, with D-Block & S-te-Fan taking the third Thursday and Digital Punk the fourth Thursday of the month.

The WE R Hardstyle radio show was later changed into I AM HARDSTYLE Radio which is presented from their radio studio including a guest mix each month.

Albums

Discography 
Full discography including his aliases and releases under the former Brennan & Heart name.

References

External links 
 Official Site

1982 births
Hardstyle musicians
21st-century Dutch musicians
Dutch DJs
Living people
Electronic dance music DJs